USS Owl may refer to the following ships of the United States Navy:

 , laid down 25 October 1917 by the Todd Shipbuilding Corp., Brooklyn, New York.
 , originally laid down as LCI(L)-982 was laid down 23 March 1944 by Consolidated Steel Corp., Orange, Texas.

References 

United States Navy ship names